is a 1959 Japanese drama film by Shōhei Imamura. The screenplay is based on the diary of ten-year-old zainichi (ethnic Korean Japanese) Sueko Yasumoto, which became a bestseller upon publication.

Plot
The film tells the story of four orphans living in an impoverished mining town.

Cast
 Hiroyuki Nagato as Kiichi Yasumoto, eldest brother
 Kayo Matsuo as Yoshiko, eldest sister
 Takeshi Okimura as Kōichi, second brother
 Akiko Maeda as Sueko, younger sister
 Kō Nishimura as Gorō Mitamura
 Yoshio Ōmori as Seki
 Toshio Takahara as shop assistant (bicycle shop)
 Taiji Tonoyama as Gengorō Henmi
 Shinsuke Ashida as Sakai
 Kazuko Yoshiyuki as Kanako Hori
 Shōichi Ozawa as Haruo Kanayama

Reception
Film scholar Alexander Jacoby called My Second Brother an "uncharacteristically tender film" for the director.

Awards
 Mainichi Film Award – Best Supporting Actress (Kanako Hori), Best Sound (Fumio Hashimoto)
 Blue Ribbon Awards – Best Actor (Hiroyuki Nagato), Best Supporting Actor (Shōichi Ozawa)

References

External links
 
 

1959 films
1959 drama films
Japanese drama films
Japanese black-and-white films
Films directed by Shohei Imamura
Nikkatsu films
Films with screenplays by Ichirô Ikeda
1950s Japanese films